The Ministry of Foreign Affairs of Bosnia and Herzegovina is the governmental department which oversees the foreign relations of Bosnia and Herzegovina.

List of ministers

Ministers of Foreign Affairs of the Republic of Bosnia and Herzegovina (1990–1996)
Political parties:

Ministers of Foreign Affairs of Bosnia and Herzegovina (1997–present)
Political parties:

See also
Foreign relations of Bosnia and Herzegovina

External links

Foreign Affairs
Foreign relations of Bosnia and Herzegovina
Bosnia and Herzegovina